The Integrated National Police (INP) (Filipino: Pinagsamang Pulisyáng Pambansà, PPP; Spanish:Policía Nacional Conjunto, PNC) was the municipal police force for the cities and large towns of the Republic of the Philippines. One of two national police forces in the country along with the Philippine Constabulary, it merged with the latter in 1991 to form the present Philippine National Police.

Development
Until the mid-1970s, the independent city and municipal police forces took charge of maintaining peace and order on a local level, and when necessary was reinforced by the Philippine Constabulary, the national  gendarmerie that was a major branch of the Armed Forces of the Philippines. The National Police Commission was established in 1966 to improve the professionalism and training of local police and exercised some supervisory authority over the police.

During martial law in the Philippines under President Ferdinand Marcos, several presidential decrees were amalgamating the police, fire, and jail services of the 1,500 cities and municipalities into a unified national police and civil defense formation, the Integrated National Police (INP), beginning in 1974. On August 8, 1975, Presidential Decree 765 officially established the joint command structure of the Philippine Constabulary and Integrated National Police. The arrangement became known as the Philippine Constabulary-Integrated National Police (PC-INP), and INP became also an element of the Armed Forces since it was then under supervision of the Constabulary. The commanding general of the Constabulary was also concurrently the Director General of the INP, responsible to the Minister of National Defense and to the President.

Criticism
The Integrated National Police was the subject of criticism, and officers were accused of involvement in illegal activities, violent acts and abuse, with corruption being a frequent charge. To save their public image, the government sponsored highly publicised programs to identify and punish police offenders, and training designed to raise their standard of appearance, conduct, and performance.

Organization
The INP, as a paramilitary national police force and due to its joint command with the PC, used the rank system of the Armed Forces of the Philippines in force at that time in keeping with the provisions of Presidential Decree No. 1184 (the Integrated National Police Personnel Professionalization Law of 1977).

As an organization that is a part of the PC, the Commanding General PC, since 1975, was also Director General of the INP and its 13 regional commanders serving as regional chiefs of police responsible for the 73 Provincial INP Commands, which in turn, were responsible for the operations of the police districts, city and municipal police stations, substations and precincts under their control. In Metro Manila, the Philippine Constabulary Metropolitan Command was concurrent chief of the Metropolitan (Manila) Police Force, underwhich the capital's 4 police districts were under his supervision, which in turn were organized into the city and town police stations and subordinate units. Fire and  jail protection units were under the overall control of the national headquarters thru regional commands.

Merger
On New Year's Day 1991, the INP was subsumed into the PC to form the Philippine National Police (PNP), which took responsibility for most former INP functions including the fire and penal services, The PNP assumed responsibility for the counterinsurgency effort from the Armed Forces of the Philippines in 1993.

See also
Philippine Constabulary
Philippine National Police

References
Citations

Bibliography

External links
Philippines - Law Enforcement

Defunct law enforcement agencies of the Philippines
Philippine National Police
Establishments by Philippine presidential decree